Fabian Daniel Rohner (born 17 August 1998) is a Swiss professional footballer who plays as a right midfielder a for FC Zürich in the Swiss Super League.

Club career
In 2013, Rohner scored with FC Zurich U15 in a 6-1 victory over the women's team.

On 6 January 2017, Rohner signed his first professional contract with FC Zürich. He made his professional debut for FCZ in a 2–1 Swiss Super League loss to FC Luzern on 10 December 2017.

On 25 July 2019, Rohner was loaned out to FC Wil for the 2019–20 season.

International career
Rohner is a youth international for Switzerland at the U18, U19, and U20 levels.

References

External links
 
 
 SFL Profile

1998 births
Living people
Footballers from Zürich
Swiss men's footballers
Association football midfielders
Switzerland youth international footballers
Swiss Super League players
Swiss Challenge League players
FC Zürich players
FC Wil players